Allen Denton is an American television journalist. He was a news anchor for San Diego independent station KUSI-TV and has been a co-anchor at KNTV in San Jose, California.

Career 
Denton started his career as a Radio DJ following high school. He spent the next 11 years as radio disc jockey and newscaster. As a television journalist Denton was with WBKO-TV in Bowling Green, Kentucky (1981-1982), WTVW, in Evansville, Indiana (1982-1983), WTVK-TV (now WVLT-TV), in Knoxville, Tennessee (1983-1986), WSPA-TV, in Spartanburg, South Carolina (1986-1993), WAVE-TV in Louisville, Kentucky (1993-1995), WCNC-TV in Charlotte, North Carolina (1995-2000), KNTV in San Francisco Bay Area (2000-2009) and KUSI-TV in San Diego (2009-2019).  

Denton's major stories on KUSI's public affairs program ‘San Diego People’ include a day on the U-S-S Albuquerque submarine, the America's Cup time trials, California’s recall of Governor Gray Davis, the inauguration of Governor Arnold Schwarzenegger, Texas Governor Rick Perry's Presidential bid and the resignation of San Diego Mayor Bob Filner. He retired from KUSI-TV in February 2019.

Awards 
Denton has won three Emmy awards: the first for co-anchoring a live broadcast of the Breeder's Cup race from Churchill Downs. Then for his coverage of the 2002 Winter Olympics in Salt Lake City. His third  Emmy was for a documentary about the year that followed 9/11. Denton has also been awarded two Associated Press awards, one for Best Anchor in the San Francisco market, and another for Best Live Coverage of a News Event. In 2016, Denton was nominated for a southern California regional EMMY for his work on a two part special report on the USS Albuquerque.

References

External links 
 KUSI biography page

Living people
Television anchors from San Francisco
Year of birth missing (living people)
Television anchors from San Diego